Ordinary Fool is an album by Paul Williams, released in 1975. Notable songs from the album include "Flash", "Ordinary Fool" and "Don't Call It Love".

Track listing 
All tracks composed by Paul Williams; except where indicated
 "Flash" (Art Munson, Paul Williams)
 "Lifeboat" (Ken Ascher, Paul Williams)
 "Lonestar" (Ken Ascher, Paul Williams)
 "Time and Tide"
 "Even Better Than I Know Myself"
 "Don't Call It Love" (Art Munson, Paul Williams)
 "Lonely Hearts" (Theme from The Day of the Locust) (John Barry, Paul Williams)
 "Old Souls" (From Phantom of the Paradise)
 "Ordinary Fool" (From Bugsy Malone)
 "Soul Rest"

Ella Fitzgerald recorded "Ordinary Fool" on her Pablo release, Montreux '77.

Charts

References

1975 albums
Paul Williams (songwriter) albums
A&M Records albums
Albums recorded at A&M Studios